Keith Turner may refer to:
Keith Turner (businessman), New Zealand businessman
Keith Turner (motorcyclist), former Grand Prix motorcycle road racer from New Zealand
Keith Turner, participant in the 2006 Harris County, Texas hate crime assault